Wacky Wednesday is a book for young readers, written by Dr. Seuss as Theo. LeSieg and illustrated by George Booth.  It has forty-eight pages, and is based around a world of progressively wackier occurrences, where kids can point out that there is a picture frame upside down, a palm tree growing in the toilet, an earthworm chasing a bird, an airplane flying backward, a tiger chauffeur, and a traffic light showing that stop is green and go is red, as some examples.

Plot
The main character, an unnamed child who serves as the narrator, wakes up to find a shoe on the wall then looks up to find one on the ceiling as well. With each new page, the number of "wacky" things grows, as the child goes through a morning routine and makes it to George Washington School, trying to alert others to the wacky occurrences. The classmates ignore these warnings, and the teacher, Miss Bass, thinks this is disrupting the class and throws the child out (implying that no one can see these things but him).

As the world gets progressively crazier, the child runs around trying to escape it or find help, and eventually runs into Patrolman McGann, who declares that Wacky Wednesday will end as soon as every last wacky thing has been counted – the final page having 20 in total.

At the end, the shoe on the wall disappears as the child goes to bed.

Television series
A television series based on the book and aimed at preschoolers is in development for Netflix.

See also
 Dr. Seuss books

References

External links
 The full book Wacky Wednesday on YouTube

Books by Dr. Seuss
1974 children's books
Random House books